Jewell-Lightburne Historic District is a national historic district located at Liberty, Clay County, Missouri.  It encompasses 236 contributing buildings in a predominantly residential section of Liberty. The district developed between about 1852 and 1946, and includes representative examples of Greek Revival, Queen Anne, Tudor Revival, Prairie School, and Bungalow / American Craftsman style residential architecture.  Located in the district is the separately listed Frank Hughes Memorial Library.

It was listed on the National Register of Historic Places in 2001.

References

Historic districts on the National Register of Historic Places in Missouri
Greek Revival architecture in Missouri
Queen Anne architecture in Missouri
Tudor Revival architecture in Missouri
Prairie School architecture in Missouri
Bungalow architecture in Missouri
Buildings and structures in Clay County, Missouri
National Register of Historic Places in Clay County, Missouri
Liberty, Missouri